S-One is a Japanese robot made by Tokyo-based company Schaft to compete in the Robotics Challenge, a DARPA-organized competition with an aim to "discover" the most up-to-date humanoid robots.

S-One won the competition with 27 points out of 32 by completing tasks such as clearing the ground of objects and passing through debris without difficulty. The S-One lost points when it was unable to exit from a vehicle.

Characteristics
S-One is 130 cm (4 feet 17⁄64 inches) high and weighs 95 kg (209 lbs).

References

Robots of Japan